Lawrence Edward Coutre (April 11, 1928 – May 19, 2008) was a halfback in the National Football League.

Biography
Coutre was born on April 11, 1928 in Chicago.

Coutre died May 19, 2008 due to a heart aneurism in Boca Raton, Florida.

Career
Coutre was drafted by the Green Bay Packers in the fourth round of the 1950 NFL Draft and played that season with the team. After two seasons away from the NFL, he would split the 1953 NFL season between the Packers and the Baltimore Colts.

He played at the collegiate level at the University of Notre Dame.

He was also in the FBI and served papers to lawyers.

See also
List of Green Bay Packers players

References

Players of American football from Chicago
Green Bay Packers players
Baltimore Colts players
American football halfbacks
Notre Dame Fighting Irish football players
1928 births
2008 deaths